Posad was a historical type of East Slavic settlement.

Posad may also refer to:

Settlements in Russia
Posad, Arkhangelsk Oblast
Posad, Vereshchaginsky District
Posad, Kishertsky District, Perm Krai

Other
Pavel Posád (born 1953), Czech Roman Catholic bishop

See also